Annie Saumont (1927 – 31 January 2017) was a French short story writer and English to French translator.

Saumont started as a specialist in English literature and an English to French translator. She has translated books by V.S. Naipaul, Nadine Gordimer and John Fowles among others.

Saumont is best known for her many collections of short stories. She published books of short stories over a period of over thirty years, and won a number of prizes for her work, including the 1981 Prix Goncourt de la Nouvelle for Quelquefois dans les cérémonies, the 1989 SGDL Short Story prize for Je suis pas un camion, and the 1993 Renaissance Short Story Prize for  Les voilà quel bonheur.

Bibliography
Short Stories
 La vie à l'endroit, Mercure de France, 1969
 Enseigne pour une école de monstres, Gallimard, 1977
 Dieu regarde et se tait, Gallimard, 1979, H.B. Éditions, 2000
 Quelquefois dans les cérémonies, Gallimard, 1981.
 Si on les tuait ?, Luneau-Ascot, 1984, Julliard, 1994
 Il n'y a pas de musique des sphères, Luneau-Ascot, 1985
 La terre est à nous, Ramsay, 1987, Gallimard, 1999, Julliard, 2009,
  Je suis pas un camion, Seghers, 1989. Prix SGDL de la nouvelle. Julliard, 1996. Pocket, 2000.
 Moi les enfants j'aime pas tellement, Syros, 1990. Julliard, 2001. Pocket, 2003.
 Quelque chose de la vie, Seghers, 1990, Julliard, 2000
 Les voilà, quel bonheur, Julliard, 1993.
 Le lait est un liquide blanc, Atelier Julliard, 1995. Julliard, 2002.
 Après, Juillard, 1996. Pocket, 1998.
 Embrassons-nous, Julliard, 1998, Pocket 1999.
 Noir comme d'habitude, Julliard, 2000. Pocket, 2002.
 C'est rien, ça va passer, Julliard, 2002. Prix des Editeurs. Pocket, 2004.
 Les derniers jours heureux, Joëlle Losfeld, 2002.
 Aldo, mon ami, Flammarion, 2002
 Un soir, à la maison, Julliard, 2003.
 Les blés suivi de Pour Marie, Joëlle Losfeld, 2003.
 Nabiroga suivi de Le trou, Joëlle Losfeld, 2004.
 Un pique-nique en Lorraine, Joëlle Losfeld, 2005.
 La guerre est déclarée et autres nouvelles, 2005.
 koman sa sécri émé, Julliard 2005
 Un mariage en hiver, Éditions du Chemin de fer, 2005.
 Qu'est-ce qu'il y a dans la rue qui t'intéresse tellement ?, Joëlle Losfeld, 2006.
 Vous descendrez à l'arrêt Roussillon, Bleu autour, 2007.
 La rivière, vu par Anne Laure Sacriste, Éditions du Chemin de fer, 2007.
 Gammes, Joëlle Losfeld, 2008.
 Les croissants du dimanche, Julliard, 2008. Pocket, 2010.
 Une voiture blanche, Bleu autour, 2008.
 Autrefois le mois dernier, vu par documentation céline duval, Éditions du Chemin de fer, 2009
 Encore une belle journée, Julliard, 2010. Pocket, 2011.
 Le tapis du salon, Julliard, 2012
 Le pont, vu par Philippe Lemaire, Éditions du Chemin de fer, 2012

English to French Translations
 V.S. Naipaul, Guerilleros trans by Annie Saumont (France loisirs, 1981)
 V.S. Naipaul, Dis-moi qui tuer trans by Annie Saumont (Albin Michel, 1983)
 Nadine Gordimer, Ceux de July (July's People, 1981) trans by Annie Saumont (Albin Michel, 1983)
 V.S. Naipaul, Mr. Stone trans by Annie Saumont (Albin Michel, 1985)
 John Fowles, La Creature trans by Annie Saumont (Albin Michel, 1987)
 John Fowles, La Tour d'ébène trans by Annie Saumont (Albin Michel, 1988)
 J D Salinger, L'Attrape-Coeurs trans by Annie Saumont (Robert Laffont, 1986, 2004)
 John Fowles, Le Mage trans by Annie Saumont (Albin Michel, 2006)

References

External links
 Biography (in French)
 Profile on WebLettres (In French)

1927 births
2017 deaths
English–French translators
People from Manche
Writers from Normandy
20th-century French novelists
21st-century French novelists
French women short story writers
French short story writers
Prix Goncourt de la nouvelle recipients
21st-century French women writers
20th-century French women writers
20th-century translators